Franck Sorbier is a Paris fashion house that achieved haute couture status in 2005.

After working successfully for Chantal Thomass and Thierry Mugler, the French fashion designer Franck Sorbier, who was born in 1961, presented his first collection in 1987. 
Then, some major stores, such as Bergdorf Goodman, Neiman Marcus in the United States, Seibu in Japan, noticed him.
In 1995, the renowned French jeweller and watchmaker Cartier gave him the opportunity to present his winter 95/96 collection in a prestigious place, the "Carrousel du Louvre".  In 1996, he became a member of the French Federation of Couture and Ready-To-Wear, supported by Jean Paul Gaultier and Sonia Rykiel. In 1999, Franck Sorbier designed glasses for Vuarnet sunglasses. He presented his first couture collection this same year.
As of summer 2011, Franck Sorbier has been selling seats to his couture collections through the Fonds de Dotation Sorbier website, to fund his collections.

References

External links
Franck Sorbier - Official site

Franck Sorbier's Couture collections since 2004Au-Feminin.com

High fashion brands
Haute couture
Sorbier